The streaked fantail (Rhipidura verreauxi) is a species of bird in the family Rhipiduridae.  Rhipidura verreauxi has precedence over Rhipidura spilodera (Dickinson & Watling 2006).  It is found in Fiji, New Caledonia, and Vanuatu.  Its natural habitats are subtropical or tropical moist lowland forests and subtropical or tropical moist montane forests.

Taxonomy 

According to IOC there are 5 recognised subspecies. In alphabetical order, these are:

 R. v. erythronota	Sharpe, 1879
 R. v. layardi	Salvadori, 1877
 R. v. rufilateralis	Sharpe, 1879
 R. v. spilodera	Gray, GR, 1870
 R. v. verreauxi	Marie, 1870

Streaked fantail (R. verreauxi)  forms a superspecies with: 
 Brown fantail (R. drownei)
 Makira fantail (R. tenebrosa)
 Rennell fantail (R. rennelliana)
 Kadavu fantail (R. personata)
 Samoan fantail (R. nebulosa)

References

streaked fantail
Birds of Fiji
Birds of New Caledonia
Birds of Vanuatu
streaked fantail
Taxonomy articles created by Polbot